A casino hotel is an establishment consisting of a casino with temporary lodging provided in an on-premises hotel. Customers receive the benefits of both gambling facilities and lodging. Since the casino and hotel are located on the same premises, a gambler's necessities can be provided for in one location.

The casino may offer common forms of gambling including slot machines, table games, and sports betting. The hotel, nearby or directly connected to the casino, provides lodging and may include other popular services such as food and beverages, valet parking, a swimming pool, health club, and on-site entertainment. Many casino hotels in popular destinations such as the Las Vegas Strip and Atlantic City, New Jersey, operate as resort hotels with additional services such as upscale lodgings, ballrooms, and large conference facilities. Such establishments recruit their gambling accommodations with workers to manage not only all the game processes but also more common entertainment elements for which they need choreographers, conjurers, and streamers.

Casino hotels can be significant employers in an area; in 2009 in Atlantic City, Local 54 of the Hotel Employees and Restaurant Employees Union represented 22,000 casino hotel workers.

See also
 List of casino hotels

References

Further reading
 "Service climate and customer satisfaction in a casino hotel: An exploratory case study". International Journal of Hospitality Management.
 "Analysis of Las Vegas Strip casino hotel capacity: an inventory model for optimization". Tourism Management.
 "Yield management in Las Vegas casino hotels".  Cornell Hotel and Restaurant Administration Quarterly.
 "The Modern Las Vegas Casino-Hotel: The Paradigmatic New Means of Consumption"
 "Intrinsic and extrinsic factors impacting casino hotel chefs' job satisfaction". International Journal of Contemporary Hospitality Management.
 "Analysis of Return on Hotel Investment: A Comparison of Commercial Hotel Companies and Casino Hotel Companies". Journal of Hospitality & Tourism .
 "Performance Measurement Through Cash Flow Ratios and Traditional Ratios: A Comparison of Commercial and Casino Hotel Companies". The Journal of Hospitality Financial Management.
 "Job Stress Among Casino Hotel Chefs in a Top-Tier Tourism City". Journal of Hospitality Marketing & Management.
 "Ben Siegel: Father of Las Vegas and the Modern Casino-Hotel". Wiley.
 "Investing in the Casino Hotel". Cornell University School of Hotel Administration.
 "Smoke gets in your eyes - Examining air quality in casino-hotels". Cornell Hotel and Restaurant Administration Quarterly.
 "The Contribution of the Casino Hotel Industry to New Jersey’s Economy". Rutgers.
 "A Primer on the Casino Hotel". Cornell University School of Hotel Administration.
 "The Modern Las Vegas Casino-Hotel: The Paradigmatic New Means of Consumption". Management.
 Penner, Richard H.; Adams, Lawrence; Rutes, Walter (2013). Hotel Design, Planning and Development. Routledge. pp. 361- . 
 Kilby, Jim; Fox, Jim; Lucas, Anthony F. (2006). Casino Operations Management. John Wiley & Sons. pp. 49- . 
 Atlantic City Casino Hotel Association (1982). A Report on the Economic Impact of Atlantic City Casino Hotel Operations for 1981. The Association. 6 pages.

 
Casinos
Hotel types